Tim Chiou (born November 23, 1979) is an American actor who has played a number of television and film roles. He most notably played the reoccurring role of the venture capitalist Ed Chen on Season 4 of HBO's Silicon Valley.

Education
Chiou attended UCLA where he was involved in the Asian American theatre company on campus, LCC, which had been co-founded by Randall Park just several years prior. He would later join Park to form the comedy troupe "The Propaganders".

Career
Chiou's most prominent role to date is as the venture capitalist Ed Chen on Season 4 of HBO's Silicon Valley. The character, who works at the fictional Raviga Capital Management, serves as a parody of Silicon Valley "bro" culture.

On television, he also played A.J., the Gang leader on IZombie, and on TV shows such as House M.D., The Cape (as Kwan), Victorious, Parenthood (as Mike Garrison), CSI:NY, Grey's Anatomy, Southland, Dollhouse (as Travis Nikoden), NCIS (as Officer Kevin Lim), Hannah Montana, Chuck, Just Jordan, and 'Til Death.

Chiou has starred in feature films such as multi-character film Crossing Over also starring Harrison Ford, Ray Liotta, Ashley Judd, Justin Chon, Leonardo Nam and more, Seventh Moon opposite Amy Smart as her love interest, Quentin Lee's The People I've Slept With as Fred, the husband of Lynn Chen's character, Juliet, and as "The Wang" in Abraham Lim's The Achievers, written by Michael Golamco. He has also been in a number of independent short films such as James Huang's Represent and The Adventures of Johnny Karate and Golden Delicious, Viet Nguyen's Ninja Say What, and Nadine Truong's Initiation.

Chiou has also appeared in the Colony Theater production of Michael Golamco's play, Year Zero as Han as well as the production of the play at the Victory Gardens Theater in Chicago. Chiou has also appeared in Snow Falling on Cedars at Theaterworks in Silicon Valley as Kabuo Miyamoto, Beth Henley's Crimes of the Heart at East West Players, You Can't Take It with You at the Geffen Playhouse as well as the Berkeley Repertory Theater production of Heidi Stillman's The North China Lover, a stage adaptation of Marguerite Duras's novel, The Lover. He has also reprised his role as "The Lover" in Looking Glass Theater's 2013 Chicago production of Heidi Stillman's The North China Lover, the play getting rave reviews from The Chicago Sun-Times, Time Out Chicago, and The Chicago Theater Beat.

Chiou has also appeared in print modeling ads for companies such as GNC.

Awards
Chiou won a "Best Actor" award at the 8th Annual NBC Short Cuts Film Festival in 2013 for his performance as "King" in Kevin Lau's short film, Made in Chinatown opposite Elaine Kao. The awards ceremony was hosted by Craig Robinson, and the film Made in Chinatown also won awards for Best Short (presented by Marlon Wayans), and Best Writing. For the 2013 NBC Short Cuts Film Festival, only eight films made the final cut of finalists considered for awards out of the 1400 total films submitted.

Filmography

References

External links
Tim Chiou's Official Site

American male television actors
Living people
21st-century American male actors
Place of birth missing (living people)
American male stage actors
American people of Taiwanese descent
University of California, Los Angeles alumni
1979 births